Madhya Pradesh Cricket Association Ground or Neemkheda Stadium is a multi-purpose stadium in Jabalpur, Madhya Pradesh, India. The ground is mainly used for organizing matches of football, cricket and other sports. The ground has floodlights so that the stadium can host day-night matches. It is made considering all norms of BCCI so that Ranji Trophy matches can be played. The stadium was established in 2012 when the stadium hosted a match of Dr Shafquat Mohammed Khan Under-18 Inter Divisional Tournament 2011/12 between Jabalpur Under-18s v Narmadapuram Under-18s.

References

External links 

 cricketarchive
 MPCA

Cricket grounds in Madhya Pradesh
Buildings and structures in Madhya Pradesh
Sports venues in Madhya Pradesh
Sports venues completed in 2012
2012 establishments in Madhya Pradesh
Sports venues in Jabalpur

Buildings and structures in Jabalpur